Abarema lehmannii is a species of plant in the family Fabaceae. It is endemic to the Cordillera Central in Antioquia, Colombia. It can be found at the margins of humid montane forests.

References

lehmannii
Vulnerable plants
Endemic flora of Colombia
Taxonomy articles created by Polbot